The Liber de arte distillandi de simplicibus (Book on the art of distillation out of simple ingredients [«simplicia»] or Kleines Destillierbuch) is a German book by Hieronymus Brunschwig published on 8 May 1500 by Johann Grüninger. It was the first book on the subject of distillation written in the German language, and was also the first book on chemistry published in the English vernacular. The Liber consists of a manual on how to distill medicinal waters, and combines traditional practices with technical instructions.

Background 

The Liber de arte distillandi de simplicibus, despite its Latin title, was written fully in German, and is the first work on distillation that was printed in the language, with previous works having been written in Latin. It is one of several manuals and treatises on scientific topics by Hieronymus Brunschwig, and is the first of his books on distillation, followed by the Liber de arte distillandi de compositis (Großes Destillierbuch) in 1512. 

The Kleines Destillierbuch draws heavily from earlier alchemical works, though there are only a few explicit references to alchemy within the text itself. Specifically, Brunschwig cites the 14th-century alchemist Jean de Roquetaillade frequently in reference to the concept of "quintessence" which is a concept that derives from Roquetaillade's book De consideratione quintae essentiae. In both Roqeutaillade's and Brunschwig's approaches, the goal of alchemy and distillation is to strip away the earthly four elements to leave only the heavenly quintessence, a substance that has beneficial properties. However, Brunschwig differs from Roquetaillade in that he does not purport that distillate substances are entirely heavenly essences, only that they are more heavenly than their non-distilled counterparts.

Contents 
The Kleines Destillierbuch consists of a total of 230 pages divided in fourths. It is split into three parts, the first with 23 chapters explaining the process of distillation, the second comprising a list of plants whose products can be distilled, and the third consisting of an index of diseases which can be treated by the medicinal waters produced through distillation. Each page has two columns with 47 lines of text, and many have a woodcut illustration of varying sizes of stills, plants or animals. Most of these woodcuts had been used before in Johann Grüningers press for books such as the Buch der cirurgia (1497) or Grüningers reprinting (1497) of the Hortus Sanitatis (first edition Mainz 1491), or they were copies of these formerly used woodcuts.

Illustrations

Types of illustrations of plants using the same woodblock a second time

Types of illustrations of animals using the same woodblock a second time

Types of illustrations of plants using a new woodblock with a reversed copy

Types of illustrations of plants using a woodblock, that shows a similar-looking plant

Impact 
The Kleines Destillierbuch was extremely successful commercially and was published in 16 different editions from 1500 to 1568. It directly influenced the later works of Philipp Ulstad, Eucharius Rösslin, and Adam Lonicer.

The book's impact reached outside of Germany, and it was one of the first works about the natural sciences that was translated into English. It was also the first book specifically on chemistry that was translated into English. It was translated into Dutch in 1517, into English in 1527, and into Czech in 1559.

References 

1500 books
Incunabula
Alchemical documents